Juventino Sánchez (born 25 January 1945) is a Mexican former sports shooter. He competed in the 50 metre pistol event at the 1972 Summer Olympics.

References

1945 births
Living people
Mexican male sport shooters
Olympic shooters of Mexico
Shooters at the 1972 Summer Olympics
Place of birth missing (living people)
Pan American Games medalists in shooting
Pan American Games bronze medalists for Mexico
Shooters at the 1975 Pan American Games
20th-century Mexican people